Alfred Matthews may refer to:

 Alf Matthews (1901–1985), British footballer
 Alf Matthews (boxer) (1938–1997), British boxer
 A. E. Matthews (Alfred Edward Matthews, 1869–1960), English actor

See also
Alfred Mathews (1864-1946), Welsh international rugby player
Al Matthews (disambiguation)